Rashed Hassan (Arabic:راشد حسن) (born 17 November 1991) is an Emirati footballer wo plays for Al Dhaid as a forward.

References

External links
 

Emirati footballers
1991 births
Living people
Al Shabab Al Arabi Club Dubai players
Shabab Al-Ahli Club players
Khor Fakkan Sports Club players
Ajman Club players
Al Dhaid SC players
UAE Pro League players
UAE First Division League players
Association football forwards